Manin may refer to:

Places
Manin, Syria, a town near Damascus
Manin, Pas-de-Calais in France

Other uses
Manin (surname)
Manin gold chain

See also
Turmanin, a town near Aleppo, Syria